Mathilda Guez (15 August 1918 – 3 May 1990) was an Israeli politician who served as a member of the Knesset for Rafi and its successors from 1965 until 1977.

Biography
Born in Sousse in Tunisia, Guez was educated at a French high school. In 1936 she married and moved to Sfax. During World War II she was deported along with the rest of the local Jewish community. After the family returned to their homes, she became involved in Zionist activities; in 1948 she became a member of Youth Aliyah, and was also president of the Tunisian branch of WIZO.

In 1957 she made aliyah to Israel after meeting David Ben-Gurion during a trip to Jerusalem, and joined Mapai, working in its Immigrant Absorption department. In 1959 Guez became a member of the World Jewish Congress directorate. Along with Ben-Gurion, she was amongst the Mapai members that left to form Rafi in 1965, and was elected to the Knesset on the new party's list later that year. She was re-elected in 1969 (by which time Rafi had merged into the Alignment) and 1973, before losing her seat in the 1977 elections.

She died in 1990 at the age of 71.

References

External links
 

1918 births
1990 deaths
20th-century Tunisian Jews
People from Sousse
Zionists
Jewish women politicians
Tunisian emigrants to Israel
Women members of the Knesset
Rafi (political party) politicians
Mapai politicians
Israeli Labor Party politicians
Alignment (Israel) politicians
Israeli people of Tunisian-Jewish descent
Members of the 6th Knesset (1965–1969)
Members of the 7th Knesset (1969–1974)
Members of the 8th Knesset (1974–1977)
20th-century Israeli women politicians